Cerist railway station served the town of Llanidloes, in the historical county of Montgomeryshire, Wales, from 1873 to 1940 on the Van Railway.

History 
The station was opened on 1 December 1873 by the Van Railway. It was a request stop, where trains only stopped on Tuesday. The last trains were shown in the timetable in October 1875 but Trains were shown again in September 1876. Its name was shown as Cerist Siding in the handbook of stations. The station closed to passengers in July 1879 and closed to goods on 4 November 1940.

References 

Disused railway stations in Powys
Railway stations in Great Britain opened in 1873
Railway stations in Great Britain closed in 1879
1873 establishments in Wales
1940 disestablishments in Wales